Prodema is a wood based material used for the interior and exterior of buildings. It is made up of natural wood with a bakelite core. Also known as a composite wooden panel, it has been in use since the early 1900s.
It is renowned for its durability and versatility, ranging in thickness from 6-22mm. Due to its composite properties, Prodema is often used for insulation to structures.

Uses
Prodema can be adapted to many forms, including flooring, walls, exterior of buildings, archways, doors, ceilings, furniture. As it comes in panel form, the wood is treated with advanced machinery and chemicals to provide a longer life and supported with a selection of metals such as aluminium, stainless steel, and iron.

Composition
Prodema is a composite panel faced with a natural wood veneer and coated with a proprietary coating based on synthetic resins and PVDF which protect the panel from the effects of sunlight, chemical attack (anti-graffiti) and the damage caused by atmospheric agents.

Composite materials